The 2018 Americas Challenge was a curling challenge that took place from January 11 to 13 at the Western Fair Sports Centre in London, Ontario. The challenge round determined which nation would qualify to the last Americas Zone spot at the 2018 World Men's Curling Championship. Brazil and Canada played a best-of-five series to determine the winner in the men's event.

The Challenge was held concurrently with the 2018 Continental Cup of Curling, the first time it was held on arena ice and not at a dedicated curling facility.

Background
The World Curling Federation allots two spots at the World Men's Curling Championship to the Americas Zone, which are normally taken by Canada and the United States. However, the World Curling Federation allows for other member nations in the Americas Zone (i.e. Brazil) to challenge Canada and/or the United States for berths to the World Championships. As hosts, the United States receive an automatic berth to the 2018 World Men's Championships. Thus, Brazil is allowed to challenge Canada for a berth to the 2018 World Championships. This will be Brazil's first men's challenge of Canada; it had unsuccessfully challenged the United States in 2017, 2015, 2010 and 2009.

Men's event

Teams
The teams are listed as follows:

Results

Game 1
Thursday, January 11, 19:00

Game 2
Friday, January 12, 14:30

Game 3
Friday, January 12, 19:00

References

2018 in Canadian curling
2018 in Ontario
Sports competitions in London, Ontario
January 2018 sports events in Canada
Curling in Ontario
International curling competitions hosted by Canada
Americas Challenge